Thomas Manners-Sutton, 1st Baron Manners,  (24 February 1756 – 31 May 1842) was a British lawyer and politician who served as Lord Chancellor of Ireland from 1807 to 1827.

Background and education
Manners-Sutton was the sixth son of Lord George Manners-Sutton (third son of John Manners, 3rd Duke of Rutland) and his wife Diana Chaplin, daughter of Thomas Chaplin. His elder brother the Most Reverend Charles Manners-Sutton was Archbishop of Canterbury from 1805 to 1828 and the father of Charles Manners-Sutton, 1st Viscount Canterbury, Speaker of the House of Commons from 1817 to 1834. His father had assumed the additional surname of Sutton on succeeding to the estates of his maternal grandfather Robert Sutton, 2nd Baron Lexinton.

Manners-Sutton was educated at Charterhouse School and Emmanuel College, Cambridge (matriculated 1773, graduated B.A. as 5th wrangler 1777, M.A. 1780), was admitted to Lincoln's Inn in 1775, and called to the Bar in 1780.

Political, legal and judicial career
Manners-Sutton was elected Member of Parliament for Newark in 1796, a seat he held until 1805, and served under Henry Addington as Solicitor-General from 1802 to 1805. From 1800 to 1802 he was Solicitor General to the Prince of Wales (later King George IV).

In 1805 he became a Baron of the Exchequer, which he remained until 1807. The latter year he was admitted to the Privy Council, raised to the peerage as Baron Manners, of Foston in the County of Lincoln, and appointed Lord Chancellor of Ireland, in which position he served until 1827. A staunch protestant, Lord Manners was an opponent of Catholic emancipation and argued against the Catholic Relief Act 1829 in the House of Lords. His unfamiliarity with Irish conditions led him to rely heavily on the Attorney-General for Ireland, William Saurin, who thereby acquired unprecedented power and virtually controlled the Dublin administration until his dismissal in 1822, which was caused by his firm opposition to Emancipation, which made him a political liability.

Although opposed to Catholic Emancipation, Manners as a judge showed no bias against Catholics: indeed he handed down a landmark ruling in Walsh's case in 1823, that in Ireland as opposed to England a bequest for the saying of Mass for the testators' soul was valid in law (English law was finally changed in favour of the validity of the bequest in 1919). The increasing number of Catholic barristers (even Daniel O'Connell, who had a low opinion of most Irish judges) paid tribute to his impartiality.

Family
Lord Manners married firstly, Anne Copley, daughter of Sir Joseph Copley, 1st Baronet, of Sprotborough and his wife Mary Buller, in 1803. They had no children. After his wife's death in 1814, he married secondly the Honourable Jane Butler, daughter of James Butler, 9th Baron Cahir and Sarah Nicholls, and sister of Richard Butler, 1st Earl of Glengall. They had one son, John Manners-Sutton. Lord Manners died in May 1842, aged 86, and was succeeded in the barony by his only son, John. A family relation, Evelyn Levett Sutton, graduate of Trinity College, Cambridge, acted as private chaplain to Lord Manners.

References

External links 
 

1756 births
1842 deaths
People educated at Charterhouse School
Alumni of Emmanuel College, Cambridge
Members of the Parliament of Great Britain for English constituencies
British MPs 1796–1800
Members of the Parliament of the United Kingdom for English constituencies
UK MPs 1801–1802
UK MPs 1802–1806
UK MPs who were granted peerages
Members of the Privy Council of the United Kingdom
Members of the Privy Council of Ireland
Barons in the Peerage of the United Kingdom
Barons of the Exchequer
Solicitors General for England and Wales
Lord chancellors of Ireland
T
Peers of the United Kingdom created by George III